Aegires corrugatus is a species of sea slug, a nudibranch, a marine, opisthobranch gastropod mollusc in the family Aegiridae.

Distribution
This species was described from Cuba. It has been reported from Guadeloupe and Martinique.

References

Aegiridae
Gastropods described in 2015